John E. Carlstrom (born 1957) is an American astrophysicist, and Professor, Departments of Astronomy and Astrophysics, and Physics, at the University of Chicago.

He graduated from Vassar College with a B.A. in 1981, and from the University of California, Berkeley with a Ph.D. in 1988.

Carlstrom specializes in measurements of the Cosmic Microwave Background, and has led several experiments including the Degree Angular Scale Interferometer, the Sunyaev-Zel'dovich Array, and the South Pole Telescope.

He is also known for manufacturing the Gunn oscillators used at several millimeter and submillimeter observatories such as the BIMA array, the Caltech Submillimeter Observatory and the James Clerk Maxwell Telescope.   These oscillators produced the local oscillator signal for the observatorys' heterodyne receivers.

Awards
 1998 MacArthur Fellows Program
 2004 Magellanic Gold Medal
 2006 Beatrice M. Tinsley Prize
 2015 Gruber Prize in Cosmology
 2020 Elected a Legacy Fellow of the American Astronomical Society

References

External links
John E. Carlstrom", Scientific Commons

1957 births
Living people
American astronomers
University of Chicago faculty
Vassar College alumni
University of California, Berkeley alumni
MacArthur Fellows
Members of the United States National Academy of Sciences
Fellows of the American Physical Society
Fellows of the American Astronomical Society